Péter Balázs (born 5 December 1941) is a Hungarian politician who served  as Minister of Foreign Affairs from 2009 to 2010.

In addition to his native Hungarian, he speaks English, French, German and Russian.

He graduated from Budapest School of Economics in 1963 and worked in the Hungarian government until 1 May 2004, when his country joined the European Union and was appointed to the European Commission with Michel Barnier under Romano Prodi.

He became the Hungarian European Commissioner holding the Regional Policy portfolio until the end of the Prodi Commission on 21 November 2004. He was succeeded by László Kovács as the Hungarian Commissioner and Danuta Hübner as Commissioner for regional policy.

Balázs became a professor at the International Relations and European Studies Department of the Central European University (CEU), Budapest. In 2005, he established a new research center for EU Enlargement Studies at the CEU.

Balázs became the Hungarian Minister of Foreign Affairs in April 2009, serving until May 2010. Balázs, when addressing the topic of Hungary-Slovakia relations compared the creation of the language law of Slovakia to the politics of the Ceauşescu regime on the use of language. He was succeeded by János Martonyi.

Balázs is a member of the advisory board of the Prague European Summit.

External links
Website on ec.europa.eu
CV on ec.europa.eu
Interview with Euractiv.com

References

1941 births
Living people
People from Kecskemét
Hungarian European Commissioners
Foreign ministers of Hungary
Academic staff of Central European University
Ambassadors of Hungary to Germany
Corvinus University of Budapest alumni
Members of the Bajnai Government